AIR National was an Indian radio station. It was run by All India Radio. Programming is mainly in Hindi and English languages. These programmes emphasize entertainment, music and news. The channel is designed to represent India's cultural mosaic and ethos.

The programmes of National Channel are broadcast by a one megawatt transmitter from Nagpur,Kolkata, Delhi, Bangalore, and Aligarh.

References

All India Radio